The Newark Bears is the name of four different sports teams:

 Newark Bears, a team that played from 1998 to 2013 in the Atlantic League of Professional Baseball and Canadian American Association of Professional Baseball.
 Newark Bears (International League), the original baseball team beginning in 1917 that last played in 1949.
 Newark Bears (AFL), a 1926 team of the first American Football League.
 Newark Bears, a name used by a descendant of the Orange/Newark Tornadoes after it was bought by the Chicago Bears